Aplochiton taeniatus is a species of amphidromous galaxiid native to Argentina and Chile in South America. The proposed species A. marinus, endemic to Chile, is considered by FishBase and the Catalog of Fishes to be a junior synonym of A. taeniatus, though the IUCN and ITIS list it as a valid species.

References
 

taeniatus
Taxa named by Leonard Jenyns
Fish described in 1842